The Holman ministry (19161920), also known as the Second Holman ministry or Holman Nationalist ministry was the 36th ministry of the New South Wales Government, and was led by the 19th Premier, William Holman.

Holman was elected to the New South Wales Legislative Assembly in 1898, serving until 1920, before being elected to the Australian House of Representatives. Holman had earlier served as Deputy Leader in the ministry of James McGowen, before replacing McGowen as leader of the parliamentary Labor Party and serving as Labor Premier between 1913 and 1916.

In November 1916 Labor split over conscription, when Premier Holman, and twenty of his supporters were expelled from the party for defying party policy and supporting conscription. Holman and his supporters joined a grand coalition with the members of the various conservative parties. By 1917, this had coalesced into the Nationalist Party of Australia, with Holman as leader. At the 1917 state election, Holman stood as a candidate for the Nationalist Party, and successfully retained his seat of Cootamundra.

The ministry covers the period from 15 November 1916 until 12 April 1920, when Holman lost his seat as serving Premier and his government was defeated at the 1920 state election by Labor's John Storey.

Composition of ministry

 
Ministers are members of the Legislative Assembly unless otherwise noted.

See also

Holman Labor ministry

References

 

New South Wales ministries
1916 establishments in Australia
1920 disestablishments in Australia